The 2015–16 figure skating season began on July 1, 2015, and ended on June 30, 2016. Elite skaters began the season competing on the Grand Prix series or Junior Grand Prix series, culminating in the Grand Prix Final, and the ISU Challenger Series. Following national championships, competitors appeared at ISU Championships, such as the 2016 European, Four Continents, World Junior, and World Championships.

Season notes

Age eligibility

Partnership changes 
Some skaters announced the dissolution of a partnership or formation of a new one. Listed are changes involving at least one partner who competed at Worlds, Europeans, Four Continents, Junior Worlds or the senior Grand Prix, or who medaled on the Junior Grand Prix circuit. The ISU does not permit teams to compete for two countries—if skaters of different nationalities team up, they must choose one country to represent.

Coaching changes

Retirements

Competitions 

International competitions:

Key

International medalists

Men

Ladies

Pairs

Ice dance

Season's best scores

Men 
Best total score

Best short program score

Best free skating score

Ladies 
Best total score

Best short program score

Best free skating score

Pairs 
Best total score

Best short program score

Best free skating score

Ice dance 
Best total score

Best short dance score

Best free dance score

Standings and ranking

Season-end standings (top 30)

Men's singles

Ladies' singles

Pairs

Ice dance

Season's ranking (top 30)

Men's singles

Ladies' singles

Pairs

Ice dance

References

External links 
 International Skating Union

Seasons in figure skating